America One was an American television network established in 1995 by USFR Media Group through its America One Television subsidiary. The network served over 170 LPTV, Class A, full-power, cable and satellite affiliate stations. It was one of the first TV stations to have online live video streaming, before the tech bubble burst in 2000.  At least twenty of the stations carried America One's complete 168-hour weekly transmission.

In 2003, the network went through a restructuring, being placed within USFR Media Group's VOTH Network, Inc. subsidiary.

In 2009, the network came under the ownership of America One Television Network, Inc. as a result of a shareholder buyout from USFR Media Group.

In 2010, America One Television Network merged with B2 Broadcasting to create the holding company One Media Corp, Inc., which America One & B2 Broadcasting then became subsidiaries of, while retaining their respective brand identities.

According to its press release in 2013, it broadcast "5500 live and exclusive events, over 100 U.S. Colleges, 70 professional sports teams and hundreds of top professional leagues from Asia and Europe."

It was reported in September 2014 that One Media Corp had sold America One to Center Post Networks, LLC, owner of Youtoo TV. The sale was finalized sometime in spring 2015, with Center Post Networks merging the two networks, resulting in both networks being replaced by YTA TV. The sports assets were not included in the merger, as those had been spun off to One World Sports, then to Eleven Sports Network in 2017.

Programming
America One aired a mix of entertainment and US & international sports programming in prime time. Cooking, travel and news shows and classic movies made up the network's daytime programming. The network also encouraged preemption of four hours per day of its programming for local sports, entertainment or news.

America One Sports
America One held the U.S. broadcast rights to the Ontario Hockey League, Australian Football League, the USAR Hooters Pro Cup, the ECHL, playoffs in the Indoor Football League, and the American Hockey League's all star game. America One syndicated many of these broadcasts to various regional sports networks in the US (usually, those not part of the Fox Sports Net family). America One also carried tape-delayed broadcasts of the English Premier League, specifically Bolton Wanderers and Everton. America One also showed Midwest-based Victory Fighting M.M.A. Usually, those events were on tape delay.

In 1999, America One broadcast NWA Wildside pro wrestling.

America One had broadcast rights to several rugby league organizations. From 2010 the predominantly Britain-based Super League matches were shown live (rights to that league have since transitioned to Fox Sports 2 (then called Fuel TV)  in 2013) in addition to Australasia's National Rugby League games. They also showed the American National Rugby League Grand final.

Historically, America One had a longstanding partnership with the Canadian Football League that lasted through much of the 2000s; this ended prior to the 2010 season, with NFL Network taking over U.S. broadcast rights; as of 2014, ESPN holds those rights.

In 2012, America One became the first American network to broadcast a Nippon Professional Baseball (NPB) game (Hiroshima Toyo Carp home game) on tape delay.

Affiliates
Affiliates received four minutes per hour for ads and end breaks while having to secure cable carriage themselves. One of the stations that was affiliated with America One was KPDC-LP.

One Media Corp
From 2010 to 2015, it was owned and operated by One Media Corp, based in Dallas, Texas, which also operates
One CNNXT, a broadband transport company
B2 Broadcasting, a premier provider of reliable and secure international high definition television transport and pay-per-view broadcasting service

See also
YTA TV
One World Sports
Independent News Network

References

External links
 American One website (still active, but not functional)

Television networks in the United States
Canadian Football League on television
Television channels and stations established in 1995
Television channels and stations disestablished in 2015
1995 establishments in the United States
2015 disestablishments in the United States
Defunct television networks in the United States